Thomas John Ball (27 June 1882 – 18 February 1919) was an English professional golfer. Ball placed second in the 1908 Open Championship and tied for second place in the 1909 Open Championship. He won the Belgian Open twice, in 1913 and again in 1914. He won the 1909 News of the World Match Play tournament.

Golf career

1908 Open Championship
The 1908 Open Championship was held 18–19 June at Prestwick Golf Club in Prestwick, South Ayrshire, Scotland. Scottish professional James Braid won the Championship for the fourth time, eight strokes ahead of runner-up Ball. Ball's round-by-round scores were 76-73-76-74=299. The primary difference between Ball's score and Braid's was the first round scoring when Braid's superb 70 put him in excellent position to win—which he eventually did. Ball took home £25 for his fine performance.

1909 Open Championship
The 1909 Open Championship was held 10–11 June at Royal Cinque Ports Golf Club in Deal, Kent, England. English star J.H. Taylor won the Championship for the fourth time, six strokes ahead of runners-up Ball and James Braid.  Ball carded rounds of 74-75-76-76=301—winning £20 in the process—and finished six shots behind the winning score of 295 posted by J.H. Taylor.

Family
Ball's father, William (1856–1926), was a greenkeeper from Hoylake. His brothers Sydney, William Henry (Harry) and Frank were also professional golfers, as was Harry's son Errie.

Death and legacy
Ball died on 18 February 1919 in Wimbledon, Surrey, England. He is best remembered for having three top-10 finishes in the Open Championship, including a second-place finish in 1908.

Tournament wins (7)
Note: This list may be incomplete.
1908 Leeds Cup
1909 News of the World Match Play, Liverpool and District Professional Championship
1910 Liverpool and District Professional Championship
1911 Southern Professional Foursomes Tournament (with Fred Robson), 
1913 Belgian Open
1914 Belgian Open

Results in major championships

Note: Ball only played in The Open Championship.

WD = withdrew
CUT = missed the half-way cut
"T" indicates a tie for a place

Team appearances
England–Scotland Professional Match (representing England): 1909 (winners), 1910 (winners), 1912 (tie), 1913 (winners)
Coronation Match (representing the Professionals): 1911 (winners)

References

English male golfers
British Army personnel of World War I
Royal Field Artillery soldiers
British military personnel killed in World War I
People from Hoylake
1882 births
1919 deaths